Shakhawat Hossain Rony  is a Bangladeshi footballer who currently plays for Fortis FC in Bangladesh Premier League. He usually plays as a striker, but can also operate as right winger or false nine.

International goals

Olympic Team
Scores and results list Bangladesh U23's goal tally first.

National team

On 21 March 2011, Rony made his international debut against Palestine during 2011 AFC Challenge Cup Qualification.
He scored his first goal for the national team against Nepal during 2013 AFC Challenge Cup Qualification. He also scored a brace against Bhutan in 2015 SAFF Championship.

Scores and results list Bangladesh's goal tally first.

Club
Dhaka Abahani Limited

Lt. Sheik Jamal Dhanmondi Club Ltd.

Sheikh Russel KC

Achievement
Dhaka Abahani Limited

 Bangladesh Premier League: 2011–12

Lt. Sheikh Jamal Dhanmondi Club Ltd.

 Bangladesh Premier League: 2013–14, 2014–15
 Federation Cup: 2013–14, 2014–15
 King's Cup (Bhutan): 2014

References

External links
 
 
 Sakhawat Hossain Rony at Soccerway 

1993 births
Living people
Bangladeshi footballers
Bangladesh international footballers
Mohammedan SC (Dhaka) players
Sheikh Russel KC players
Abahani Limited (Dhaka) players
Association football forwards
Footballers from Dhaka
Abahani Limited (Chittagong) players
Bangladesh Football Premier League players